The men's 110 metres hurdles event at the 1991 Pan American Games was held in Havana, Cuba with the final on 7 August.

Medalists

Results

Heats
Wind:Heat 1: +2.4 m/s, Heat 2: +0.9 m/s

Final
Wind: +0.8 m/s

References

Athletics at the 1991 Pan American Games
1991